These are the rosters of all participating teams at the men's water polo tournament at the 2011 World Aquatics Championships held between July 17–30 at the Shanghai Oriental Sports Center in Shanghai, China.

Source

Source

Source

Source

Source

Source

Source

Source

Source

Source

Source

Source

Source

Source

Source

Source

See also
Water polo at the 2011 World Aquatics Championships – Women's team rosters

References

External links
Official website
Records and statistics (reports by Omega)

World Aquatics Championships water polo squads
Men's team rosters